Kainoyama Isamu (born Isamu Irii; June 28, 1940 – July 5, 1997) was a sumo wrestler from Ryūgasaki, Ibaraki, Japan. He made his professional debut in May 1955, and reached the top division in January 1961. His highest rank was sekiwake. Upon retirement from active competition he became an elder in the Japan Sumo Association under the name Onogawa. He left the Sumo Association in September 1971.

Career record
The Kyushu tournament was first held in 1957, and the Nagoya tournament in 1958.

See also
Glossary of sumo terms
List of past sumo wrestlers
List of sumo tournament top division runners-up
List of sumo tournament second division champions
List of sekiwake

References

1940 births
Japanese sumo wrestlers
Sumo people from Ibaraki Prefecture
Sekiwake
1997 deaths